Patriot Transportation is an American trucking and real estate holding company based in Jacksonville, Florida. Through its affiliates, Patriot specializes in moving freight consisting mainly of petroleum products and other liquids and also dry bulk commodities. FRP Development Corp, the companies real estate division, acquires, constructs, leases and manages land and commercial buildings. As of September 30, 2013, Patriot Transportation had approximately $287.1 million in total assets.

See also
 Florida Rock Industries
 Vulcan Materials

References

External links
Patriot Transportation Official Web Site.

Companies based in Jacksonville, Florida
American companies established in 1988
Companies listed on the Nasdaq
1988 establishments in Florida
Publicly traded companies based in Jacksonville, Florida